These are the matches that Las Palmas have played in European football competitions. The club's first entry into European football was the 1969–70 Inter-Cities Fairs Cup, with their first official entry in the 1972–73 UEFA Cup.

UEFA-organised seasonal competitions 
Las Palmas's score listed first.

UEFA Cup

UEFA-non organised seasonal competitions

Inter-Cities Fairs Cup

Overall record

By competition 
As of 19 October 1977

Source: UEFA.comPld = Matches played; W = Matches won; D = Matches drawn; L = Matches lost; GF = Goals for; GA = Goals against; GD = Goal Difference.

See also

 Football in Spain
 European Club Association

References

Europe
Las Palmas